Events in the year 1892 in India.

Incumbents
 Empress of India – Queen Victoria
 Viceroy of India – Henry Petty-Fitzmaurice, 5th Marquess of Lansdowne

Events
 National income - 5,630 million

Law
Colonial Probates Act (British statute)
Foreign Marriage Act (British statute)
Superannuation Act (British statute)

Births
4 January – J. C. Kumarappa, economist (d.1960).

Full date unknown
Fatima Begum, actress and India's first female film director (d.1983).
Abdul Majid Daryabadi, Muslim writer and exegete of the Qur'an (d.1977).

Deaths
28 October – Lal Behari Dey, journalist (b. 1824).

 
India
Years of the 19th century in India